The Antiquary's Books series was edited by John Charles Cox, and published in London by Methuen & Co. It comprised some 28 titles. In relation to British parish history, it has been said that

"[...] several of Cox's series (1904–15) of Antiquary's Books retained their value, notably his own contributions on parish registers and churchwarden's accounts and Nathaniel Hone on manorial records.

List of titles

Notes

Series of books